Rugby league is a team sport played in Italy.

History
Rugby league was established in Italy prior to the 1950s, during which they played a host of other European teams.

Jean Galia's efforts in the mid-1930s to persuade his fellow countrymen in France to adopt rugby league soon attracted the attention of a trainee commercial lawyer and rugby union player in Turin, Vincenzo Bertolotto. But an exhibition game suggested for Rome did not materialise.

But after the Second World War, discontent with the policies of the Italian rugby union in refusing to strengthen their game to put it on a level with France, led to thoughts of alternatives and the Italian Rugby League was launched in 1950 after several years of talks between then RFL secretary, Bill Fallowfield, and a group of Italian rugby union dissidents.

The first game in Italy, an exhibition match in Turin by two French sides, was attended by over 4,000 fans. A local resident, Dennis Chappell, once of Wakefield helped to foster the "rebels", among them one Vincenzo Bertolotto, then an elder statesman of Italian rugby at 38 years old.

Together, they organised a six-game tour to England and Wales which included a game against a "South Wales 13" at the Brewery Field in Bridgend, future home of Celtic Crusaders. Around 2,500 attended to see South Wales win comfortably 29-11 with Ystradgynlais' Les Lewis notching a hat-trick of tries.
The Italians went on to lose all of their matches but on returning home, a Turin-based side joined the French league.

The 1950s were a high point in international rugby league, after which a few European teams would lose interest. Despite playing host to the World Champions twice in 1960 when Australia defeated Italy 37-15 in Padua and defeated Italy again 67-22 at Treviso, by 1962 the game had died out due to pressure on players from the Italian Rugby Union threatening to ban anyone caught playing rugby league. It would be left to two pioneering Australians to get the game back up and running when international rugby league began to expand again in the late 1990s.

In January 1960 at the end of their 1959–60 Kangaroo Tour, the Australian national rugby league team played two internationals against an Italian representative team. The first game, played on 23 January at the Stadio Appiani in Padua in front of 3,500 curious fans, saw the Kangaroos defeat Italy 37–15. The second game played the next day at the Stadio Omobono Tenni in Treviso, saw Australia win 67–22 in front of 3,105 fans.

Italian rugby league national team was revived in 1995 in Australia through the passion of a couple of enthusiasts by the names of Domenic (Mick) Pezzano and John Benigni. Both, were determined to have a rugby league team representing their origins compete again on the world stage, with a team formed with athletes from Australia and some from Italy. This dream was soon realised when the Italian team was invited to play in the 1995 World Sevens, which was Italy's first game since the 1960s. Pezzano coached the Italian team in the 1995 Coca-Cola World Sevens in Sydney and 1996 Super League Nines in Fiji. Other Coaches of the Italian National Team have been; David Riolo, David Penna, Craig Salvatori, Carlo Napolitano, Cameron Ciraldo and Leo Epifania.

Italy went on to record their first win, in their first year and play many other international tournaments such as the Super League World Nines and the 1997 World Sevens to name a few. There were also a number of one-off international appearances against a Lebanese Sevens team, a Lebanese 13 a side team in a promotional match for the Mediterranean Cup and in 2004 when Italy played Greece in Sydney.

In 2006 the Federazione of Italia Rugby League (FIRL) was founded. The Federazione of Italia Rugby League was officially moved to the "official observer" status by the Rugby League European Federation from an unranked position on 15 April 2008.

Governing bodies

Federazione Italiana Rugby League (FIRL) is the governing body for rugby league in Italy and has "associate member" status with the Rugby League European Federation.

Domestic competitions 
The Italian Rugby League Championship is an amateur rugby league competition called the r-Evolution League that began in 2010. There are three conferences, north, central and south.

Rugby league nines

Veneto 9s is a rugby league nines tournament held annually in Monselice, Italy. It is the main event of Italian rugby league and has been running since 2006.

National team

The Italy national team were victorious in the 2013 Rugby League World Cup qualifying tournament. They will therefore contest their first Rugby League World Cup in 2013. Italy has also participated in the 2009 European Cup and the 2000 Rugby League Emerging Nations Tournament.

See also

 Sport in Italy

References

External links
 Federazione Italiana Rugby League site
 Federazione Italiana Rugby Football League web site